Muhammad Qasim Khan (born 6 July 1959) is a Pakistani jurist who served as the 50th Chief Justice of the Lahore High Court from 19 March 2020 till 05 July 2021. He retired on 06th July 2021.

References

	

	
	

1959 births
Living people
Judges of the Lahore High Court
Pakistani judges